Solute carrier family 22 member 11 is a protein that in humans is encoded by the SLC22A11 gene.

The protein encoded by this gene is involved in the sodium-independent transport and excretion of organic anions, some of which are potentially toxic. The encoded protein is an integral membrane protein and is found mainly in the kidney and in the placenta, where it may act to prevent potentially harmful organic anions from reaching the fetus.

See also
 Solute carrier family

References

Further reading

Solute carrier family